The 2018 UTEP Miners football team represented University of Texas at El Paso in the 2018 NCAA Division I FBS football season. The Miners played their home games at the Sun Bowl in El Paso, Texas and competed in the West Division of Conference USA (C–USA). They were led by first-year head coach Dana Dimel. They finished the season 1–11, 1–7 in C-USA play to finish in a tie for sixth place in the West Division.  UTEP averaged 14,155 fans per game.

Previous season
The Miners in 2017 were led by fifth-year head coach Sean Kugler until his resignation on October 2 and then by interim head coach Mike Price, who had previously served at UTEP's head coach from 2004 to 2012.  The Miners finished the season with a record , 0–8 in C-USA play to finish in last place in the West Division. They were winless for the first time since the 1973 season.

Preseason

Award watch lists
Listed in the order that they were released

Preseason media poll
Conference USA released their preseason media poll on July 17, 2018, with the Miners predicted to finish in a tie for sixth place in the West Division.

Spring Game
The 2018 Spring Game took place in El Paso, on April 13, at 7 p.m.

Coaching staff

Schedule

Schedule Source:

Game summaries

Northern Arizona

at UNLV

at Tennessee

New Mexico State

at UTSA

North Texas

at Louisiana Tech

UAB

at Rice

Middle Tennessee

at Western Kentucky

Southern Miss

References

UTEP
UTEP Miners football seasons
UTEP Miners football